The Petit Jean River Bridge is a historic bridge in rural southern Logan County, Arkansas. The bridge carries Old Highway 109 across the Petit Jean River between Sugar Grove and Magazine. It consists of a single-span steel Pratt through truss and two masonry approach spans, set on concrete piers in the river. The bridge was built in 1938.

The bridge was listed on the National Register of Historic Places in 1995.

See also
Petit Jean River Bridge (Yell County, Arkansas)
List of bridges documented by the Historic American Engineering Record in Arkansas
List of bridges on the National Register of Historic Places in Arkansas
National Register of Historic Places listings in Logan County, Arkansas

References

External links

Historic American Engineering Record in Arkansas
Road bridges on the National Register of Historic Places in Arkansas
National Register of Historic Places in Logan County, Arkansas
Bridges completed in 1938
Steel bridges in the United States
1938 establishments in Arkansas
Transportation in Logan County, Arkansas